The Devonport Leat is a leat in Devon constructed in the 1790s to carry fresh drinking water from the high ground of Dartmoor to the expanding dockyards at Plymouth Dock (which was renamed as Devonport, Devon on 1 January 1824).

Feedwaters
It is fed by five Dartmoor rivers: the West Dart, the Cowsic, the Hart Tor Brook, the River Meavy and the Blackabrook (this last apparently was the first portion to supply Plymouth Dock).

Construction
Dartmoor granite was used to construct the water channel, as well as a small aqueduct and a tunnel.

Historic changes
Some of the water goes through underground pipes to the water treatment works at Dousland; the rest goes into the Burrator Reservoir which provides most of the water supply of Plymouth. For part of the route to Dousland the pipes follow the route of the disused Yelverton to Princetown Railway. Before the piped supply to Dousland was installed, the water was used for a hydroelectric turbine near Yelverton Reservoir and fed by a  pipe.

Route

Its water supply now ends up in Burrator Reservoir. It follows a meandering path across the moor, carefully selected by engineers to follow the natural contours of the land.

See also 
Drake's Leat

References

External links

Dartmoor
Aqueducts in England
Industrial archaeological sites in Devon